Steel Heddle Manufacturing Company Complex is a historic factory complex located in the Allegheny West neighborhood of Philadelphia, Pennsylvania. The complex consists of four buildings: the Plant (1919, 1925–1927), Main Office (c. 1919–1922), Chrome Plating Building (1951), and Lumber Storage and Garage (1930). The Plan is a five-story, "U"-shaped, reinforced concrete building on a raised basement.  The Steel Heddle Manufacturing Company manufactured heddles and other textile loom accessories.  The Philadelphia plant remained in operation until 1983.

It was added to the National Register of Historic Places in 2010. In 2018, NBC10 erroneously reported that the complex was destroyed by fire, but the buildings that burned were a block away and unrelated to Steel Heddle. The vacant Steel Heddle plant still stands in 2019.

External links 
 Steel Heddle web site

References

Industrial buildings and structures on the National Register of Historic Places in Philadelphia
Industrial buildings completed in 1919
Industrial buildings completed in 1927
Industrial buildings completed in 1930
Industrial buildings completed in 1951
Office buildings completed in 1922
Upper North Philadelphia
Burned buildings and structures in the United States
Textile machinery manufacturers of the United States